Tauksi is an uninhabited  Estonian island, located north of Puise Peninsula in Matsalu National Park. Its area is about 2,5 km2 and it is the 19th largest island of Estonia.

See also
List of islands of Estonia

Estonian islands in the Baltic
Ridala Parish
Uninhabited islands of Estonia